Sérgio Mendes Coimbra known as Serginho Paulista (little Sérgio of São Paulo) (born 13 March 1988) is a Brazilian footballer who plays for Operário Ferroviário.

Biography
Born in São Paulo state, Serginho started his career at São Paulo FC. He scored once for the team at 2007 São Paulo state championship.

He made his Campeonato Brasileiro Série A debut in a 1–2 away defeat to Atlético Paranaense on 2 December 2007. Replaced Leandro in the 46th minute and played the entire 2nd half of the match.

He then spent a season on loan to Marília, for 2008 state league and 2008 Campeonato Brasileiro Série B. He also signed a new 2-year contract with São Paulo in January 2008.

He left for Toledo Colônia Work in next year, in 4-month loan. After his contract with São Paulo expired, he left for Operário Ferroviário and also known as Serginho Paulista to disambiguate with Serginho Catarinense.

he was re-signed by Marília in July 2010.

In the next season, Marília signed left back Serginho Pernambucano and another Serginho Paulista (right back) and Sérgio Mendes Coimbra himself was released. He returned to Paraná state and played 8 times in 2011 Campeonato Brasileiro Série D. He also played along with namesake Serginho Catarinense in the first 6 months. He was known as Paulista in the fourth division.

Honours
São Paulo
Campeonato Brasileiro Série A: 2007
Operário Ferroviário
Campeonato Brasileiro Série D: 2017
Campeonato Brasileiro Série C: 2018

References

External links
Futpedia 

CBF Contract Record  
rsssfbrasil no.421

Brazilian footballers
Association football midfielders
Footballers from São Paulo
1988 births
Living people
Campeonato Brasileiro Série A players
Campeonato Brasileiro Série D players
São Paulo FC players
Marília Atlético Clube players
Toledo Esporte Clube players
Operário Ferroviário Esporte Clube players
Londrina Esporte Clube players
Retrô Futebol Clube Brasil players